Alberto Aguilar may refer to:
Alberto Aguilar (Mexican footballer) (born 1960), Mexican football manager, and former footballer
Alberto Aguilar (Spanish footballer) (born 1984), Spanish footballer
Alberto Aguilar (sprinter) (born 1985), Venezuelan sprinter
Alberto Aguilar (a Chicago-based multidisciplinary artist and educator) (born 1974), Artist/Educator/Curator